This is a list of people confirmed to have been assassinated by governments of the Soviet Union and Russian Federation. Some of the assassinations or targeted killings took place overseas.

This list does not include suspected assassinations of political opponents who died in mysterious circumstances.

See also

List of assassinations by the United States
List of Israeli assassinations
List of journalists killed in Russia
List of Second Chechen War assassinations
Operations conducted by the Mossad

References

External links
Heidi Blake. 2017. From Russia With Blood: 14 Suspected Hits On British Soil. BuzzFeed. 15 Jun.
Elias Groll. 2018. A Brief History of Attempted Russian Assassinations by Poison. Foreign Policy. 9 Mar.
GRU Archives. 2019. Bellingcat. 23 Nov.
Rob Price and Shona Ghosh. 2018. List of alleged Russian assassinations in Britain. Business Insider. 6 Mar.
Russia Archives. 2019. Bellingcat. 3 Dec.
Skripal Archives. 2019. Bellingcat. 14 Oct.
Жертви політичної епохи Путіна. 2015. Radio Svoboda. 13 Dec.

Political repression
Assassinations
Assassinations
Lists of assassinations
Assassinations)
Assassinations